HMS Ocean was the last of the Royal Navy's four s to be completed in the mid-1860s. She was originally laid down as a 91-gun second-rate ship of the line, and was converted during construction to an armoured frigate. The ship spent the bulk of her career on the China Station and served as flagship there for a time. Upon her return to Great Britain in 1872 her hull was found to be partly rotten and she was placed in reserve until she was sold for scrap in 1882.

Design and description
The ship had a draught of  forward and  aft. She displaced .

Her hull was sheathed with Muntz metal to reduce biofouling. Her crew consisted of 605 officers and ratings.

Propulsion
Ocean had a simple horizontal 2-cylinder horizontal return connecting-rod steam engine driving a single propeller shaft using steam was provided by eight rectangular boilers. Yards were added to the ship's mizzenmast by 1866 and Ocean was given a full ship rig which she retained for the rest of her career.

Armament
Ocean was initially armed with twenty-four  rifled muzzle-loading guns. Four of these guns were mounted on the upper deck as chase guns, two each fore and aft. It was credited with the ability to penetrate  of armour. In 1867 four of these guns were replaced by  rifled muzzle-loaders.

Armour
One small conning tower was fitted on each side of the upper deck amidships, but these proved to be untenable when the ship's guns were fired.

Service history
HMS Ocean was laid down on 23 August 1860 as a wooden two-deck, 90-gun ship of the line by Devonport Dockyard. The Admiralty ordered on 5 June 1861 that she be lengthened , cut down one deck, and converted to an armoured frigate for the price of £298,851. The ship was launched on 19 March 1863 and commissioned in July 1866, but was not completed until 6 September 1866. Ocean initially served with the Channel Fleet, but she was almost immediately transferred to the Mediterranean, and from there to the Far East; she arrived in Batavia (now Jakarta) on 15 October 1867. She was the only armoured ship ever to double the Cape of Good Hope under canvas alone. During this voyage Ocean set a record in having sailed  on 26 August 1867 with cold boilers, the greatest distance ever covered under sail power by a British ironclad.

Ocean served on the China Station for five years, 1867–1872, without docking once. In 1871, Ocean ran down and sunk a large Chinese junk at Amoy. The Admiralty therefore ordered that she return home via the Cape of Good Hope using steam. The ship's bottom was very foul and she averaged only 4.5 knots (8.3 km/h) during the voyage. Ocean had lost a lot of sheathing during her time in the Far East and much of her planking was in a bad state. The ship was therefore relegated to dockyard reserve until sold in 1882.

Footnotes

References

 
 
 
 

 

Bulwark-class battleships (1859)
Prince Consort-class ironclads
Ships built in Plymouth, Devon
1863 ships
Victorian-era battleships of the United Kingdom